Jacob Jusu Saffa is a Sierra Leonean politician serving as Chief Minister of Sierra Leone since 30 April 2021.

Saffa holds a Bachelor of Science (honours) degree in economics from Fourah Bay College, University of Sierra Leone and a Master of Arts degree in Economic Development and Planning from the Institute for Economic Development and Planning (IDEP) of the United Nations Economic Commission for Africa in Dakar, Senegal.

From 2005 to 2011, Saffa was the National Secretary General of the Sierra Leone People's Party.

From 2018 until his appointment as Chief Minister in 2021, Saffa was Minister of Finance.

Other activities
 African Development Bank (AfDB), Ex-Officio Member of the Board of Governors (since 2018)
 ECOWAS Bank for Investment and Development (EBID), Ex-Officio Member of the Board of Governors (since 2018)

References

|-

Living people
Year of birth missing (living people)
Place of birth missing (living people)
Finance ministers of Sierra Leone
Chief Ministers of Sierra Leone